In mathematics, a Hironaka decomposition is a representation of an algebra over a field as a finitely generated free module over a polynomial subalgebra or a regular local ring. Such decompositions are named after Heisuke Hironaka, who used this in his unpublished master's thesis at Kyoto University . 

Hironaka's criterion , sometimes called miracle flatness, states that a local ring R that is a finitely generated module over a regular Noetherian local ring S is Cohen–Macaulay if and only if it is a free module over S. There is a similar result for rings that are graded over a field rather than local.

Explicit decomposition of an invariant algebra 
.

Another important result, due to Noether, is that any finitely-generated graded algebra  with  admits a (not necessarily unique) homogeneous system of parameters (HSOP). A HSOP (also termed primary invariants) is a set of homogeneous polynomials, which satisfy two properties:

 The  are algebraically independent.

Importantly, this implies that the algebra can then be expressed as a finitely-generated module over the subalgebra generated by the HSOP, . In particular, one may write 
, 

Now if  is Cohen–Macaulay, which is the case if  is linearly reductive, then it is a free (and as already stated, finitely-generated) module over any HSOP. Thus, one in fact has a Hironaka decomposition 
. 
This specifies the multiplication in  unambiguously.

See also

Rees decomposition
Stanley decomposition

References

 

Commutative algebra